Gérald Baudouin (born 15 November 1972) is a retired French athlete who specialised in the pole vault. He represented his country at the 1993 World Championships without qualifying for the final. In addition, he won the gold medal at the 1994 Jeux de la Francophonie.

His personal bests in the event are 5.80 metres outdoor (Villeneuve d'Ascq 1994) and 5.65 metres indoors (Montreal 1994).

Competition record

References

1972 births
Living people
French male pole vaulters
World Athletics Championships athletes for France
20th-century French people
21st-century French people